Gregory Road is a proposed Tri-Rail Coastal Link Green Line station in West Palm Beach, Florida. The station is slated for construction at Georgia Avenue and Gregory Road, just west of South Dixie Highway (US 1).

References

External links
 Proposed site in Google Maps Street View

West Palm Beach, Florida
Tri-Rail stations in Palm Beach County, Florida
Proposed Tri-Rail stations